HMS Cressy was a 74-gun third rate ship of the line of the Royal Navy, launched on 7 March 1810 at Frindsbury.

Service

St George was jury-rigged and so Captain Atkins of Defence refused to leave her without the Admiral's permission. As a result, both were wrecked near Ringkøbing. Cressy did not ask for permission and so avoided wrecking.

Both St George and Defence lost almost all their crews, including the Admiral. Most of the bodies that came ashore were buried in the sand dunes of Thorsminde, which have been known ever since as "Dead Mens Dunes".

Shortly after the outbreak of the War of 1812, on 12 August, Cressy shared in the seizure of several American vessels: Cuba, Caliban, Edward, Galen, Halcyon, and Cygnet.

Fate
She was broken up in 1832.

Notes, citations, and references
Notes

Citations

References

Lavery, Brian (2003) The Ship of the Line - Volume 1: The development of the battlefleet 1650-1850. Conway Maritime Press. .

Ships of the line of the Royal Navy
Vengeur-class ships of the line
Ships built on the River Medway
1810 ships